Deepin (stylized as deepin; formerly known as Linux Deepin and Hiweed Linux) is a Linux distribution based on the Debian "stable" branch. It features the Deepin Desktop Environment (DDE), built on Qt and available for a variety of distributions. The userbase is predominantly Chinese, though it is in most prominent Linux distributions' repositories as an alternative desktop environment. The company behind the development, Deepin Technology, a wholly owned subsidiary of UnionTech, is based in Wuhan, China.

History 
The distribution began in 2004 as Hiweed Linux. In 2011, the development team behind Deepin established a company named Deepin Technology to support commercial development of the operating system. The company received business investments the same year it was founded.

Deepin Technology joined the Linux Foundation in 2015. In 2019, Huawei started to ship Linux laptops pre-installed with Deepin.

deepin has introduced a new package manager called "linglong"

Overview 
Deepin ships a mix of open-source and proprietary programs such as Google Chrome, Spotify and Steam. It also includes a software suite of applications developed by Deepin Technology, as well as WPS Office, 360 Security Guard, CodeWeavers' CrossOver and many others.

The development of Deepin is led by China-based Deepin Technology Co., Ltd. The company generates revenue through the sale of technical support and other services related to it. As of 1 January 2020, Deepin Technology is a wholly owned subsidiary of UnionTech. The release cycle has followed various schedules but currently aims at four releases per year. Releases are delayed if the work of development and testing has not been completed.

The distribution is widely praised for its aesthetics in various reviews, while it has also been criticized for various perceived breaches in user privacy.

Market share 
According to Deepin, in December 2022 the operating system had more than 3 million users worldwide, supported 33 languages, and had accumulated more than 80 million downloads since 2008 (when it was renamed "Deepin" from "Hiweed Linux" and also changed to Ubuntu and Gnome as a basis).

Deepin Desktop Environment 
Deepin features its own desktop environment called Deepin DE or DDE for short. It is written in Qt. The distribution also maintains their own Window Manager dde-kwin. The desktop environment was described as "the single most beautiful desktop on the market" by Jack Wallen writing for TechRepublic. The DDE is also available in the software repositories of Fedora 30.

UbuntuDDE and Manjaro Deepin are community-supported distributions, that feature the Deepin Desktop Environment and some deepin applications. It is also possible to install DDE (Deepin Desktop Environment) on Arch Linux.

Deepin applications 
Deepin comes with a number of applications built via the DTK (Deepin Tool Kit), which is based on C++ and Qt. The following is a list of Deepin Applications created by the Deepin development team:

 Deepin Boot Maker
 Deepin Installer
 Deepin File Manager
 Deepin System Monitor
 Deepin Package Manager
 Deepin Font Installer
 Deepin Clone
 Deepin Picker
 Deepin Store
 Deepin Screen Recorder
 Deepin Voice Recorder
 Deepin Screenshot
 Deepin Terminal
 Deepin Image Viewer
 Deepin Movie
 Deepin Cloud Print
 Deepin OpenSymbol
 Deepin Music
 Deepin Calendar
 Deepin Remote Assistant
 Deepin Manual
 Deepin Emacs
 Deepin Presentation Assistant
 Deepin Calculator
 Graphics Driver Manager
 Deepin Repair
 Deepin Editor

Deepin Installer
Deepin comes with an installer named "Deepin Installer" that was created by Deepin Technology. The Installer was praised by Swapnil Bhartiya writing for linux.com as having "the simplest installation procedure" that was also "quite pleasant." Writing for Forbes, Jason Evangelho complained about the installer requiring the user to select their location from a world map, though concluded by saying, "Aside from my little time zone selection pet peeve, the installer is beautiful, brisk and very intuitive."

Reception 
The distribution is generally praised for its aesthetics by users and reviewers alike, such as linux.com, Fossbytes and Techrepublic.

CNZZ incident 
When Deepin was accused in 2018 of containing spyware through the use of statistics software within their App Store, the company made an official statement clarifying that it did not and would not collect private user information. According to Deepin, CNZZ is a website similar to Google Analytics that collects anonymous usage information such as the screen size, browser and other user agent information to "analyze how the Deepin store was being used, in order to improve it."

On 20 July 2018, Deepin removed CNZZ statistics from the Deepin App Store website due to the backlash.

Performance 
Deepin's reputation was that it had relatively high CPU and memory demands when it was still based on GTK and HTML technologies, even when the system was idle. After switching to the Qt-based desktop environment, performance improved, as was noted by Linux.com in its September 2018 review of Deepin 15.7.

Western concerns about connections to China 
Radware's head of threat research has commented on concerns about analytics collected by Deepin, and whether these are sent to the Chinese government: while the CNZZ analytics service has been removed, analytics are still collected, now by "Umeng+". According to cybersecurity lawyer Steven T. Snyder, due to the sheer size of Deepin's codebase, it is impossible to really scrutinize all the code comprising it to be sure the Chinese government doesn't have backdoors. The project does remain fully open source allowing anyone to review, modify or change the code to meet their standards.

See also
 Linpus

References

Chinese brands
Chinese-language Linux distributions
Companies based in Wuhan
Debian-based distributions
Free desktop environments
Software companies of China
X86-64 Linux distributions
Unix windowing system-related software
Linux distributions